Benjamin Kayser (born 26 July 1984) is a French former rugby union player. He most recently played at hooker for Clermont Auvergne in the French Top 14.

Kayser rejoined Stade Français at the end of the 2008/2009 season from Leicester Tigers in the Guinness Premiership, who he joined during the 2007–08 season. While at Leicester he played as a replacement as they won the 2009 Premiership final. Kayser signed for Castres Olympique for the 2010–11 Top 14 season. In February 2011, Kayser signed a 3-year contract with ASM Clermont Auvergne.

Kayser played for France at international level, winning his first cap in their summer tour against Australia in 2008.

In 2010, Kayser was selected in the French Barbarians squad to play Tonga on 26 November. Kayser played for the Barbarians in 2018, winning against England at Twickenham.

Honours
 Stade Français
Top 14: 2006–07

 Leicester Tigers
Premiership Rugby: 2008–09

 ASM Clermont Auvergne
Top 14: 2016–17

References

External links 
 Official tigers player profile

French rugby union players
Barbarian F.C. players
1984 births
Living people
ASM Clermont Auvergne players
Rugby union hookers
France international rugby union players
Leicester Tigers players